Ben Thomson (born January 16, 1993) is a Canadian professional ice hockey forward who is currently an unrestricted free agent. He most recently played with the Henderson Silver Knights in the American Hockey League (AHL). He was drafted by the New Jersey Devils in the fourth round, 96th overall, of the 2012 NHL Entry Draft. Thomson played junior hockey with the Kitchener Rangers and North Bay Battalion of the Ontario Hockey League.

Playing career
On May 23, 2014, Thomson was signed to a three-year, entry-level contract with the New Jersey Devils. He made his NHL debut against the Philadelphia Flyers on April 4, 2017, and played two more games at the NHL level before being reassigned to the AHL.

Thomson signed a one-year, two-way contract on July 26, 2017. After attending the Devils training camp, Thomson was re-assigned to inaugural AHL affiliate, the Binghamton Devils, for the duration of the 2017–18 season. He recorded 5 goals and 13 points in 64 games, leading the team and setting a new AHL career high in penalty minutes with 119.

As a free agent from the Devils and approaching the 2018–19 season, Thomson agreed to a one-year AHL contract with the San Diego Gulls, affiliate to the Anaheim Ducks on September 6, 2018. He played 53 games with the Gulls recording 4 goals and 13 points with 91 penalty minutes.

Having left the San Diego Gulls at the conclusion of his contract, Thomson continued in the AHL for the 2019–20 season, agreeing to a one-year deal with the Bridgeport Sound Tigers, affiliate of the New York Islanders on October 5, 2019.

On December 14, 2020, Thomson continued his professional career in agreeing to a one-year ECHL contract with the Orlando Solar Bears. He featured in 10 games to begin the 2020–21 season, registering 2 assists, before returning to the Binghamton Devils organization on a professional tryout basis on February 1, 2021. After scoring in Binghamton's season opening game, Thomson was signed to a one-year AHL contract with the Devils on February 12, 2021. Thomson made 31 appearances with Binghamton in the shortened season posting 6 goals and 1 assist.

As a free agent, Thomson continued his career in the AHL, agreeing to a one-year contract with the Henderson Silver Knights, the primary affiliate to the Vegas Golden Knights, on August 16, 2021.

Career statistics

Regular season and playoffs

International

References

External links

1993 births
Living people
Albany Devils players
Binghamton Devils players
Bridgeport Sound Tigers players
Canadian ice hockey left wingers
Henderson Silver Knights players
Kitchener Rangers players
New Jersey Devils draft picks
New Jersey Devils players
North Bay Battalion players
Orlando Solar Bears (ECHL) players
People from Orangeville, Ontario
San Diego Gulls (AHL) players
Worcester Railers players